J. Suresh is an Indian film director, who has directed Tamil films. After making his debut in 1998 with Velai, he has directed other films, including Ennavale and Junior Senior. In junior senior he has worked with Mammootty in 2002. He has done hundreds of advertisement in Tamil. He has also done an album with Yuvan Shankar Raja and Ulaganayagan Kamal Haasan. He directed international films in Burma in 2018.

Career
Suresh made his debut with Velai (1998), a drama film with music composed by Yuvan Shankar Raja in his second venture. Suresh then approached Mani Ratnam to produce his next film Ennavale, but although he refused, Mani Ratnam introduced Suresh to Madhavan. The film was initially titled as Sugham, and marked the debut of actress Sneha after her first film, Virumbugiren, got delayed. The film however opened to negative reviews and did not perform well at the box office. His next film, the romantic comedy Junior Senior featuring Mammootty and Hamsavardhan, also gained poor reviews with a critic noting "absurd and haphazardly shot Junior Senior is one of the most insufferable movies in recent times".

Suresh launched a film titled Surangani in 2008, featuring music by Yuvan Shankar Raja, in which he would star in the lead role. however despite regular schedules, the film was uncompleted and never released. In 2012, he directed and starred in the lead role in Paraseega Mannan, a commercial action film set on the backdrop of child trafficking. The film was also made in Malayalam as Arabian Rajakumaran and featured music by Suresh himself, while Yuvan Shankar Raja helped him out during song discussions. The film was released in December 2012 and went unnoticed due to low key release.

Personal life
Suresh married film actress Meera during May 2001 at a temple in T Nagar, Chennai. Meera had worked on films such as Pondatti Sonna Kettukanum (1991) and Arunachalam (1997) and many Tamil and other language movies.

Filmography

References

Year of birth missing (living people)
Living people
Tamil film directors
Film directors from Tamil Nadu